Two ships of the United States Navy have been named USS Green Bay, after the city of Green Bay, Wisconsin,

 was a patrol gunboat launched in 1969, and in 1975 was transferred to the Hellenic Navy and renamed HS Tolmi (P-229)
 is an amphibious transport dock launched in 2006

See also
 , the site of an unidentified sunken sloop in Lake Michigan

United States Navy ship names